The Armstrong Siddeley Snarler was a small rocket engine used for mixed-power experiments with an early turbojet engine. and was the first British liquid-fuelled rocket engine to fly.

Design and development
Unlike other British rocket engine projects that used hydrogen peroxide as an oxidiser, Armstrong Siddeley's used liquid oxygen. Work began in 1947 and the final configuration was first tested on 29 March 1950.

The prototype of the Hawker P.1040 Sea Hawk, VP 401, had a Snarler rocket of 2,000 lbf thrust added in its tail. The Rolls-Royce Nene turbojet, of 5,200 lbf thrust, had a split tailpipe which exhausted either side of the fuselage. The combination was termed the Hawker P.1072.

This gave approximately 50% greater thrust, although with twenty times the fuel consumption. It was first used in flight on 20 November 1950, by Hawker's test pilot Trevor "Wimpy" Wade. Half a dozen flights were made using the rocket motor before a minor explosion damaged the aircraft. Although methanol was used in the P.1072, jet fuel could be used for the Snarler. It was decided that reheat was a more practical proposition for boosting jet thrust than rockets.

An unusual feature of the engine was that the fuel/oxidiser pump was externally driven, by a drive from the gearbox of the P.1072's turbojet engine. This feature continued into the first versions of the subsequent Screamer engine, but was later replaced with a turbine-driven turbopump.

Variants
ASSn.1 SnarlerThe prototype and test engines, (Ministry of Supply designation ASSn.).

Applications
 Hawker P.1072

Specifications
{{rocketspecs

|ref=''Aircraft engines of the World 1953, Flight:6 August 1954:Armstrong Siddeley Snarler
|type=rocket engine booster
|length= (overall length);  (combustion chamber length)
|diameter= (nozzle diameter)
|weight=
|fueltype=65% methanol, 35% water
|oxidiser=liquid oxygen
|capacity= fuel;  oxidiser
|pumps=externally driven accessory gearbox mounted centrifugal pumps with de-aerators
|thrust/weight=– (part thrust: –)
Specific impulse: 
Burn time: 2 minutes 45 seconds (Hawker P.1072 installation)
|fuelcon=
|specfuelcon=
}}

See also

References

Snarler
Aircraft rocket engines